Johanna Inés Francella (December 4, 1993) better known as Johanna "Yoyi" Francella is an Argentine actress. She is primarily known for her roles in Heidi, bienvenida a casa, Golpe al corazón y Millennials. She is also the daughter of actor Guillermo Francella and younger sister of fellow actor Nicolás Francella.

Professional career 
She began her career in the police soap opera Noche y día from eltrece, where she played the role of Jasmine, which marked her acting debut. The following year, Francella participated as the host of the program De girafa (of giraffe) (2015) along with Franco Nied, Camila Ambroggi and Tomás Allande on Radio y Punto. In 2016, she joined the main cast of the series Si solo si, broadcast by TV Pública and where she played Valentina.

In 2017, she played Vicky in the children's and youth series Heidi, bienvenida a casa of Nickelodeon. Shortly after, she was part of the main cast of the fiction Golpe al corazón from Telefe, there she played Celeste Farías, the love interest of Diego Figueroa (Stéfano de Gregorio). That same year, she co-starred in the play Justo en lo mejor de mi vida alongside Miguel Ángel Rodríguez, Julia Calvo, Diego Pérez and Pepe Monje at the Piccadilly Theater, being directed by the actor Luis Brandoni.

Her next television job was in the Millennials serie from Net TV, where she played the role of Alma Carrizo and shared the limelight with Nicolás Riera, Laura Laprida, Juan Manuel Guilera, Matías Mayer and Noelia Marzol.

In 2019, Johanna joined the cast of Argentina, tierra de amor y venganza where she played Malena, a photographer who works for the same newspaper as Lucía (Delfina Chaves).

Filmography

Film

Television

Music videos

Theater

Radio

References

External links 
 
 

1993 births
21st-century Argentine actresses
Argentine stage actresses
Argentine television actresses
Living people